Willis Palmer Sweatnam, Sr. (1854 - November 25, 1930) was a Broadway show actor and minstrel show performer.

Biography
He was born in Zanesville, Ohio, in 1854. He had a son, Willis Palmer Sweatnam, Jr. (1887-?)

When down on his luck in 1903, George Ade created a blackface role for Sweatnam in his new play The County Chairman, and Sweatnam proved to be one of the stars of the show.

He died on November 25, 1930 at the Lambs Club.

References

External links

1854 births
1930 deaths
Blackface minstrel performers
People from Zanesville, Ohio
Male actors from Ohio
American male stage actors